The Amazing Race Asia 1 is the first season of The Amazing Race Asia, a reality television game show based on the American series The Amazing Race. The first season of the show features ten teams of two, with a pre-existing relationship, in a race around Asia and the Pacific Rim to win US$100,000. Applications were accepted through 31 March 2006. The season began on 9 November 2006 and the season finale aired on 1 February 2007.

Malaysian workers Zabrina Fernandez and Joe Jer Tee were the winners of this season becoming the first all female team to win in an Amazing Race franchise and were also the first winners to win only the final leg.

Production

Development and filming

In October 2005, Buena Vista International Television-Asia Pacific and Sony Pictures Television International's AXN Asia announced that it had earned the right to produce the first localized production of The Amazing Race. AXN Asia, which airs the original American series, had received many written requests for an Asian production from local viewers.

Marketing
The first season of the show was supported by the following regional sponsors: Sony Electronics Asia Pacific Pte. Ltd, AirAsia, Caltex, MSN, Nokia, and Bintan Lagoon Resort. Ford was a local sponsor, while the series was also supported by Tourism Malaysia. The sponsors played a major role in the series by providing prizes and integrating their products into various tasks. In addition, AirAsia was the sole airline used by racers, while Bintan Lagoon Resort was the sequester location for eliminated teams.

To introduce the new series to an Asian audience, a promotional tour visited Seoul, Bangkok, Singapore, Kuala Lumpur, Manila, and Delhi prior to the series premiere.

Casting
In July 2006, Singaporean television personality Allan Wu was introduced as the host of The Amazing Race Asia. Ricky Ow, General Manager of SPE Networks Asia described Wu as "a big fan of The Amazing Race" and felt that "his good looks and natural charisma will offer a different appeal from the US version."

Over 1000 teams across Asia applied for the series, with registration accepted through 31 March 2006. Ultimately, ten teams were selected to participate in the race; the cast included expatriates in Thailand and Hong Kong and Indian models. Host Allan Wu commented that "the producers definitely took the time and did their homework to select the most diverse, entertaining, and controversial batch of contestants for our first season."

Broadcasting
An additional episode, subtitled "Memories" was a post-show interview special that aired one week after the season finale.

Cast
The cast consisted of a few local media representatives or their relatives. Zabrina Fernandez is a Ntv7 and Channel V television producer, as well as the sister of Malaysian film director Joshua Fernandez and Hitz.FM DJ JJ Fernandez. Aubrey Miles is a filipina actress who acted in local movies such as Prosti, Xerex, Sanib, A Beautiful Life and Gagamboy; she is also the co-host of noontime show Masayang Tanghali Bayan. Sahil Shroff is an Indian model. Prashant Raj Sachdev is an Indian actor who starred in the Bollywood movie Aag; he was also the runner-up of Mr. India 2004. Melody is a Singaporean TV and movie actress, having starred in local movies such as Street Angels and The Teenage Textbook Movie; she also played a supporting character in long-running drama Love Blossoms and its sequel, Love Blossoms II.

This season consists of five non-Asians; Andy, Francesca, Howard and Laura are from the United Kingdom, having separate representatives in Asian countries (as Andy & Laura representing Thailand), and Sandy is from New Zealand, is representing Hong Kong.

Future appearances
In 2010, Aubrey Miles appeared in Survivor Philippines: Celebrity Showdown, the Philippine version of Survivor. In 2014, Melody Chen appeared on Leg 9 of The Amazing Race 25 as a Pit Stop greeter in Singapore. In 2016, Zabrina & Joe Jer appeared as the Pit Stop greeters for the third leg of The Amazing Race Asia 5 in their home country of Malaysia. In 2017, Sahran, seven months after being elected mayor of Haslemere, appeared on the British cooking programme Come Dine with Me. In 2021, Sahil Shroff competed on Bigg Boss 15, the Indian version of Big Brother.

Results
The following teams participated in the season, with their relationships at the time of filming. Placements are listed in finishing order:

A  placement with a dagger indicates that the team was eliminated. 
An  placement with a double-dagger indicates that the team was the last to arrive at a pit stop in a non-elimination leg, and were forced to relinquish all of their money, were not allotted money for the next leg, and were not allowed to acquire money until they started the next leg.
An italicized placement means it is a team's placement at the midpoint of a double leg.
A  indicates that the team won a Fast Forward.
A  indicates that the team chose to use the Yield;  indicates the team who received it.

Notes

Episode title quotes
Episode titles are often taken from quotes made by the racers.

"I Don't Think I Can Do This" – Sahran
"They're Speedy, They're Fast And They're First" – Howard
"Give Me The Strength, Give Me The Strength" – Howard
"Just Shut Up And Do It" – Mardy
"It's Blowing Like Your Mum's Pants On A Windy Day" – Howard
"What Have You Been Eating!" – Zabrina
"Don't Stand There Doing Nothing!" – Andy
"My Legs Are Shaking Like Jelly" – Andrew
"This Is Totally, Totally Out Of This World!" – Marsio
"War Has Begun!" – Andy
"This Is Going To Be Embarrassing!" – Zabrina
"Oh My Goodness, I Have To Eat A Brain!" – Syeon
"24 Days, 15 Cities, 39,000 Kilometres And It Comes Down To This" – Allan Wu

Prizes
Individual prizes were awarded to the first team to complete some legs.

Leg 3 – A Sony High-Definition Handycam for each team member.
Leg 7 – A year's supply of an engine-cleaning fuel from Caltex.
Leg 9 – A holiday to Langkawi, Malaysia, courtesy of AirAsia.
Leg 11 – A holiday to Gold Coast, Queensland, courtesy of Caltex.
Leg 12 – US$100,000

Race summary

Leg 1 (Malaysia)

Airdate: 9 November 2006
Kuala Lumpur, Malaysia (Independence Square) (Starting Line)
Kuala Lumpur (Berjaya Times Square)
Kuala Lumpur (Kompleks Kraf) 
Shah Alam (Shah Alam Stadium – City Karting Enterprise)
Kuala Lumpur (Bukit Nanas Forest Reserve) 
Kuala Lumpur (Kuala Lumpur Tower) 

This series' first Detour was a choice between Paint or Pot. In Paint, team members had to work together to make a batik painting based on the design shown to them to receive their next clue. In Pot, one team member had to make a pot from clay using a pottery wheel while the other member controlled the wheel's spin to receive their next clue.

Additional tasks
At Berjaya Times Square, teams had to rappel down from the eight level of the shopping mall to receive their next clue.
At Shah Alam Stadium, each team member had to complete four consecutive laps around the circuit in go-karts before receiving their next clue.
On the way to the Pit Stop, teams were instructed to follow a certain trail in the Bukit Nanas Forest Reserve to the top of the Kuala Lumpur Tower.

Leg 2 (Malaysia → Indonesia)

Airdate: 16 November 2006
 Kuala Lumpur (Kuala Lumpur International Airport – Low Cost Carrier Terminal) to Jakarta, Indonesia (Soekarno–Hatta International Airport)
South Jakarta (Pasar Minggu – Ragunan Zoo) 
South Jakarta (Mampang Prapatan – SMA Negeri 60 High School ) 
East Jakarta (Taman Mini Indonesia Indah – West Sumatra Pavilion)
 South Jakarta (Kebayoran Baru – Panglima Polim Street)
Central Jakarta (Merdeka Square – National Monument) 

In this series' first Roadblock, one team member had to retrieve a clue in a box located inside a snake pit containing dangerous species second to anaconda in size, within two minutes.

In this series' first Fast Forward, teams had to search among 50 students at the courtyard inside SMA Negeri 60 High School with Sony Walkman MP3 players. The first team to find the one Walkman playing a message that they have chosen correctly could exchange the Walkman for the Fast Forward award.

This leg's Detour was a choice between Push or Sell. Both Detours were located at Panglima Polim Street. In Push, teams had to push a bakso cart  along a marked route, without spilling any soy sauce, while singing a traditional child song, "Abang Tukang Bakso" to receive their next clue. In Sell, teams had to sell (or eat) 15 bowls of bakso, each with a minimum selling price of Rp 2,000, to receive their next clue.

Additional task
At Taman Mini Indonesia Indah, teams had to perform a native Minangkabau plate dance called Tari Piring correctly to receive their next clue.

Additional note
Teams had to travel on a pre-arranged AirAsia flight to Jakarta.

Leg 3 (Indonesia)

Airdate: 23 November 2006
 Jakarta (Soekarno–Hatta International Airport) to Denpasar, Bali (Ngurah Rai International Airport)
Kuta (Kuta Beach) 
Kuta (Internet Outpost Travellers Lounge)
Ubud (Ubud Monkey Forest)
 Ubud (Bali Adventure Rafting or Elephant Safari Park)
Badung (Uluwatu Caves)
Tabanan (Tanah Lot Temple) 

In this leg's Roadblock, one team member had to dig in a marked area of sand around Kuta Beach for a souvenir, a small wooden surfboard, hidden up to  beneath the sand to receive their next clue.

This leg's Detour was a choice between Wet or Dry. In Wet, teams had to traverse down 500 steps to the Ayung River, ride through the white water rapids and complete a  course on the water until they reach their clue at the end of the course. In Dry, teams had to ride on an elephant through a course to receive their next clue.

Additional task
At the cybercafe, teams had to access the MSN Search website at the internet cafe's computers and search for the words "Amazing Race Asia" to find their next clue, which they may print out or receive from an attendant.

Leg 4 (Indonesia → Australia)

Airdate: 30 November 2006
 Denpasar (Ngurah Rai International Airport) to Sydney, New South Wales, Australia (Sydney Airport)
Sydney (Dawes Point – Pier 1)
 Sydney (Sydney Harbour Bridge or Circular Quay and Pyrmont –  Doyle's at the Quay)
Sydney (Port Jackson – Mrs Macquarie's Chair)
Sydney (City Centre – World Square (SonyCentral))
 Sydney (City Centre – Circular Quay Ferry Wharf to Manly – Manly Wharf)
Sydney (Manly – Oceanworld Manly) 
 Sydney (Manly – Manly Wharf to City Centre – Circular Quay Ferry Wharf)
 Sydney (Darling Harbour – The Tall Bounty ) 

This leg's Detour was a choice between Elevation or Crustacean. In Elevation, teams had to climb up a large number of steps to the top of the Sydney Harbour Bridge to receive their next clue. In Crustacean, teams made their way on foot to the seafood restaurant Doyle's at the Quay. Once there, they had to shell  of cold prawns, ensuring that the tail, the head and the back were properly removed, to receive their next clue from the restaurant chef.

In this leg's Roadblock, one team member had to dive into the aquarium in Oceanworld Manly, where they had to swim with sharks, stingrays, turtles and fishes to retrieve their next clue.

Additional tasks
At the SonyCentral store, teams had to take a Sony HD Camera and use it to record a video of someone singing a local bush ballad, titled "Click Go the Shears". Once they were done, they had to go back to SonyCentral and have the video be played on a television. If the person they filmed had sung the lyrics to the correct tune, the staff at SonyCentral would hand them their next clue. If not, they would have to re-do the task.
After completing the Roadblock, teams had to take a water taxi to the Pit Stop.

Leg 5 (Australia → New Zealand)

Airdate: 7 December 2006
 Sydney (Sydney Airport) to Auckland, New Zealand (Auckland Airport)
 Auckland (Auckland CBD – Auckland Ferry Terminal and Devonport – Devonport Ferry Terminal)
 Auckland (Victoria Park or Westhaven Marina)
Auckland (Sky Tower) 
Auckland (Auckland Museum) 

This leg's Detour was a choice between Rigby or Rigging. In Rugby, teams had to take a taxi to Victoria Park. Once there, they had to put on rugby jerseys and kick rugby balls to score three goals to receive their next clue from the coach. The goals would only be counted if the rugby ball was kicked into the enclosed posts a height at least 22 metres. In Rigging, teams had to travel to Westhaven Marina and find the yachts. Once there, the instructor would give the teams instructions on how to use ropes and knots to get the sail up and receive their next clue.

In this leg's Roadblock, one team member had to perform the SkyJump by falling  from the 53rd floor in a controlled descent. While the non-participating team member was watching down below, they had to use a Sony Ericsson Cyber-shot camera to take a picture of their partner doing this task. Once team members reunited, they would receive their next clue.

Additional tasks
After alighting from the ferry from Auckland, teams had to search near the Devonport Terminal for a child on a swing with their next clue.
At the Sky Tower, teams had to put on orange jumpsuits and perform the Sky City Vertigo Climb. This task involved teams having to climb up a ladder to the top of the Sky Tower where they would have the nicest view of Downtown Auckland. Their next clue would be handed to them only after they have completed the climb. Teams then made their way to a platform on level 53.

Leg 6 (New Zealand)

Airdate: 14 December 2006
 Auckland (Auckland Airport) to Dunedin (Dunedin Airport)
Queenstown (Caltex Petrol Kiosk)
  Queenstown (Skyline Gondola – Bob's Peak)
Arrowtown (Chinese Settlement)
Queenstown (Offroad Adventures) (Overnight Rest)
 Nevis River (Nevis Highwire Platform)
Gibbston Valley (Chard Farm Winery) 

This leg's Detour was a choice between Ledge or Luge. In Luge, teams had to complete a tack team relay with each team member by navigating a luge through a  circuit track a total of four times to get their next clue.

In this leg's Roadblock, one team member had to bungee jump  over Nevis Valley, reputedly the world's wildest bungee jump. They only had two minutes after they step on the platform to do so, or forfeit their turn. After they were successfully done with the jump, the bungee instructor would give them their next clue. This task was later revisited on Season 4 as a Switchback.

Additional tasks
At the Caltex Petrol Kiosk, teams had to fill up their Mitsubishi Pajero with fuel and pay for it using a Caltex Cash Card before receiving their next clue.
At Offroad Adventures, teams had to drive an all-terrain vehicle around a tricky and muddy course  in order to receive their next clue.

Leg 7 (New Zealand → Singapore → Thailand)

Airdate: 21 December 2006
 Queenstown (Queenstown Airport) to Singapore (Changi Airport)
Singapore (MacPherson – Caltex Petrol Station)
Singapore (Suntec City – Fountain of Wealth)
 Singapore (Changi Airport) to Bangkok, Thailand (Don Mueang International Airport)
Bang Pa-in (Wat Niwet Thammaprawat)
Bangkok (Golden Mount) 
 Bangkok (Larn Luang Road and Pig Memorial  or Pak Khlong Talat)
Bangkok (Wat Pho) 

In this leg's Roadblock, one team member had to climb to the top of the temple and then search through 560 golden bells for 100 clue capsules containing silver slips of paper. Out of the 100 silver slips of paper, only six contained the correct slip of paper instructing team members to receive their next clue from a temple worker.

This leg's Detour was a choice between Bacon or Eggs. In Bacon, teams would have to find marked tuk-tuks on Larn Luang Road and then direct their tuk-tuk drivers to drive them to the Memorial for People Born in the Year of Pig (called Pig Memorial by the racers) to get their next clue. Teams were allowed to seek directions from locals but could not get assistance from the driver. In Eggs, teams had to travel to Pak Khlong Talat and find an egg stall and using a trolley, deliver 26 trays of eggs to a nearby egg market at Asadang Road. Once all trays were delivered intact, the store owner would give teams their next clue. However, if any eggs were delivered broken, the store owner would instruct the teams to re-deliver that number of unbroken eggs.

Additional tasks
At the Caltex station, each team had to clean up an extremely dirty Ford Focus car until the Caltex employee in charge was satisfied to receive their next clue.
At Wat Niwet Thamaprawat, teams had to take a cable car over the river and then search the temple grounds for several clue boxes. Only one of these clue boxes would contain the right clue. Teams then had to figure out that their next destination was the Golden Mount, by finding out the monument depicted on the Thai 2 Baht coin enclosed in their clue envelope.

Leg 8 (Thailand)

Airdate: 28 December 2006
 Bangkok (Southern Bus Terminal) to Krabi (Krabi Bus Terminal)
Ao Nang (Noppharat Thara Bay)
 Hat Noppharat Thara–Mu Ko Phi Phi National Park (Pranang Bay) 
  Hat Noppharat Thara–Mu Ko Phi Phi National Park (Koh Poda)
  Ao Phang Nga National Park (Railay East 123 Wall)
 Than Bok Khorani National Park (Koh Hong Lagoon)
 Than Bok Khorani National Park (Koh Pak Bia) 

In this season's second Fast Forward, teams had to find a kayak on Pranang Bay and then using it to look for a clue hidden in one of the many hidden caves near the area. The first team to find the clue would win the Fast Forward award.

This leg's Detour was a choice between Smash or Grab. In Smash, teams would have to smash through a pile of 75 coconuts with a hammer until they found one with red ink inside it to receive their next clue. In Grab, teams had to snorkel through an area of the waters off Koh Poda with 100 buoys, each of which has an attached clue, until they found one of only marked "correct".

In this leg's Roadblock, one team member had to climb up the face of Railay East 123 Wall in order to retrieve the next clue from the top.

Additional note
From Noppharat Thara Bay, teams had to travel by a long-tail boat for the rest of the leg.

Leg 9 (Thailand → India)

Airdates: 4 and 11 January 2007
 Krabi (Krabi Airport) to Kolkata, India (Netaji Subhas Chandra Bose International Airport)
Kolkata (St. Teresa of Avila Church)
 Kolkata (Tollygunge Metro Train Station)
Kolkata (Peerless Inn Hotel – Aaheli Restaurant)
Kolkata (Kanishka's Sari Boutique)
 Kolkata (West Bengal Kabaddi Association or Maniktala Bazar)
Kolkata (Kolay Market – Bepin Behari Ganguly Street (Indian Overseas Bank Rooftop)) 
 Kolkata (Sealdah Railway Station) to New Delhi (New Delhi Railway Station)
Delhi (Red Fort – Lahori Gate) 
 Old Delhi (Khari Baoli – Gadodia Market (Sunny International Spice Shop) or Chandni Chowk and Lahori Gate Crossing)
 Delhi (Tibetan Monastery Market – Garib Gaushala)
Delhi (Mehrauli – Jain Mandir Dada Bari) 

In this leg's first Roadblock, one team member had to polish seven shoes from bystanders and charge at least 5 for their service to receive their next clue.

This leg's first Detour was a choice between Carry or Count. In Carry, teams had to deliver  of milk by carrying jugs on their heads and pouring them into a metal bucket a distance away to receive their next clue. In Count, teams had to go to Maniktala Bazar and then correctly count the number of betel nuts in a basket to receive their next clue. Teams could only guess once before counting the nuts again.

This leg's second Detour was a choice between Deliver or Donkey. In Deliver, teams had to carry sacks of spices to a spice shop, with only a picture of the shop for reference, to get their next clue. In Donkey, teams had to transport onions using a donkey to an onion store to receive their next clue from the vendor.

In this leg's second Roadblock, one team member, regardless of who performed the first Roadblock, had to fill a bucket with cow manure and then use it to make dung cakes by adding water and sticking them onto the wall to receive their next clue.

Additional tasks
At St. Teresa of Avila Church, teams were given the option to light a candle before retrieving their next clue.
At Aaheli Restaurant, each team member had to eat a traditional Bengali Indian meal to receive their next clue.
At Kanishka's Sari Boutique, teams had to search for their next clue hidden among hundreds of saris and silks.

Leg 10 (India → United Arab Emirates)

Airdate: 18 January 2007
 Delhi (Indira Gandhi International Airport) to Dubai, United Arab Emirates (Dubai International Airport)
Dubai (Abra Station) 
  Dubai (Dubai Creek Golf & Yacht Club)
Dubai (Dubai International Marine Club – Leopard of Dubai )
Dubai (Mall of the Emirates – Ski Dubai) 
Dubai (Gold Souk – Modern Jewellery Shop)
Margham (Margham Desert Camp) 

In this leg's Roadblock, one team member had to don into a golfing attire and compete a 9-hole golf course, using only a putter and one other club to receive their next clue. If team members lost a ball or broke a club, they had to return to the first tee for a replacement.

This leg's Detour was a choice between Hack or Hike. In Hack, teams had to chisel their way through a  block of ice to release their next clue, using only a chisel and a hammer. In Hike, teams had to climb the steepest slope in Ski Dubai while carrying  of skiing equipment to retrieve their next clue at the top of the slope.

Leg 11 (United Arab Emirates)

Airdate: 25 January 2007
Margham (Big Red Al Hamar – Desert Area 53) 
Sharjah (Gnat Al Qasba – Eye of the Emirates)
 Dubai (Raghdan Restaurant)
Dubai (Sheikh Saeed Al Maktoum's House)
Dubai (Wild Wadi Water Park – Jumeirah Sceirah)
Dubai (Mina A'Salam Beach overlooking Burj Al Arab) 

This leg's Detour in the Arabian Desert was a choice between Ride or Seek. In Ride, both team members had to sit on a camel and guide it through a marked course while using only a camel stick to collect five flags that they could exchange for their next clue. In Seek, teams had to use a metal detector to search a marked plot for a souvenir camel that they could exchange for their next clue.

In this leg's Roadblock, one team member had to eat an Arabian specialty dish, which consisted of brains and bread, to receive their next clue from the restaurant owner.

Additional tasks
At the Eye of the Emirates, teams had to choose one of the 42 cabins to look for a clue, with only five of the cabins containing their actual correct clue. The other cabins held clues that read "Sorry, Try Again" and teams had to complete one revolution of the ferris wheel before they could pick again.
At Wild Wadi Water Park, both team members had to ride the Jumeirah Sceirah, the tallest and fastest free-fall water slide outside of North America, to receive their next clue.

Leg 12 (United Arab Emirates → Malaysia)

Airdate: 1 February 2007
Dubai (Mina A' Salam Beach)
 Dubai (Dubai International Airport) to Kuala Lumpur, Malaysia (Kuala Lumpur International Airport)
Kuala Lumpur (Kuala Lumpur Tower)
 Sepang (Kuala Lumpur International Airport) to Kuching, Sarawak (Kuching International Airport)
Kuching (Padungan Road – Cat Statue)
Kuching (Old Courthouse) 
Kuching (Sarawak Cultural Village)
 Kuching (Permai Rainforest Resort)
Kuching (Bako National Park) 

This season's final Detour was a choice between Brain or Brawn. In Brain, teams had to assemble a bench using only a Sony Cybershot picture as reference to receive their next clue. In Brawn, teams had to go to a wet market and use traditional methods to carry  of fruits a certain distance until they receive their next clue.

In this season's final Roadblock, one team member had to compete a rope-based obstacle course overlooking the jungle to receive their final clue.

Additional tasks
At Mina A' Salam Beach, teams had to complete a jigsaw puzzle to reveal the country of their next location (Malaysia) before they could retrieve their next clue.
Once in Kuching, teams had to find a specific cat statue located in Padungan Road to find their next clue.
At the Sarawak Cultural Village, teams had to search for their next clue hidden inside one of the longhouses. Their next clue instructed each team member to hit three coloured pineapples each using darts and a blowpipe to receive their next clue.

References

External links
Official Website

Asia 1
2006 television seasons
2007 television seasons
Television shows filmed in Malaysia
Television shows filmed in Indonesia
Television shows filmed in Australia
Television shows filmed in New Zealand
Television shows filmed in Singapore
Television shows filmed in Thailand
Television shows filmed in India
Television shows filmed in the United Arab Emirates